Vellai Yaanai is a 2021 Indian Tamil-language drama film directed by Subramaniam Siva and starring Samuthirakani and Athmiya Rajan in the lead roles. Produced by Mini Studios, it was released on 11 July 2021 on Sun TV.

Plot
An agrarian community with a thriving barter system becomes prey to a profit-driven bank. The once-prosperous village soon wilts as the bank systematically tears down the village.

Cast 
Samuthirakani as Vellai Kunju
Athmiya Rajan as Vendaam Amirtham
Yogi Babu as KK as Kolukattai
S. S. Stanley as Bank Officer
E. Ramdoss 
Bava Chelladurai
Saranya Ravichandran 
Uday Mahesh
Benjamin
A. Govindamoorthy

Production 
Subramaniam Siva made a return as a director after a long sabbatical, and selected Samuthirakani to portray the lead role of a farmer. Athmiya Rajan was cast as the lead actress after the director was impressed by her performance in the Malayalam film, Joseph (2018)
Post-production for the film began in June 2019, but the film's release was delayed by two years.

Soundtrack 
Soundtrack was composed by Santhosh Narayanan.
Vennila – Vijaynarain, Sangeetha Karuppiah
Aara Thedum – Santhosh Narayanan
Vaazha Vechonae – Vijaynarain
Thandhom Thana – Mukesh Mohamed
Nellu Vaasam – Santhosh Narayanan

Release 
The film was directly released on Sun TV on 11 July 2021. A critic from Cinema Express wrote "inconsistency mars this well-intentioned Samuthirakani tearjerker", adding "inconsistent writing ruins the well-performed rural drama." Entertainment portals Behindwoods and Dinamalar gave the film mixed reviews.

References

External links 
 

2020s Tamil-language films
2021 films
Films about agriculture
Films scored by Santhosh Narayanan
Indian drama films
Indian television films
2021 drama films
2021 television films
Films directed by Subramaniam Siva